Ben-Zion Orgad (Hebrew: בן ציון אורגד, originally Ben-Zion Büschel; born Gelsenkirchen, Germany, 21 August 1926; died Tel Aviv, Israel, 28 April 2006) was an Israeli composer.

His family emigrated to Mandate Palestine in 1933, where he started violin lessons in 1936.  From 1942 until 1946, Orgad studied violin and composing with Rudolf Bergmann and Paul Ben-Haim in Tel Aviv and in 1947 with Josef Tal in Jerusalem.  In the years 1949, 1952, and 1961 he took part in composing courses at the Berkshire Music Center in Tanglewood, with Aaron Copland and others. From 1960 until 1962 he studied composing at Brandeis University in Waltham.

Beginning in 1956, Orgad was employed by the Israeli Ministry of Education, in the department of its school of music.  His musical works consist primarily of choir music and songs, although he also wrote orchestral works and chamber music.

Awards
In 1952, Orgad received the Kussewitzky Prize of UNESCO. 
In 1961, he received the Joel Engel Prize of the city of Tel Aviv.
In 1997, he was awarded the Israel Prize, for music.

See also
List of Israel Prize recipients

References

External links 
 Ben-Zion Orgad bio

1926 births
2006 deaths
Jewish emigrants from Nazi Germany to Mandatory Palestine
20th-century classical composers
Israeli male composers
Jewish composers
Jewish Israeli musicians
Israel Prize in music recipients
People from Gelsenkirchen
People from the Province of Westphalia
Deaths from cancer in Israel
Brandeis University alumni
Male classical composers
20th-century Israeli male musicians